This is a list of English football transfers for the 2005-06 season. Only moves featuring at least one Premier League or Football League Championship club are listed.

The summer transfer window opened on 1 July 2005, although a few transfers took place prior to that date. Players without a club may join one at any time, either during or in between transfer windows. Clubs below Premier League level may also sign players on loan at any time. If need be, clubs may sign a goalkeeper on an emergency loan, if all others are unavailable. The window re-opened on 1 January 2006 for one month until 00:00 UTC on 1 February 2006.

Summer transfer window

May

June

July

August

References

External links
Transfers, June 2005
Transfers, July 2005
Transfers, August 2005

Transfer lists
Summer 2005
England